Ammihud ( ‘Ammîhūḏ, "people of glory" or "renowned") is the name of several Hebrew Bible figures:
 The father of the Ephraimite chief Elishama, the father of Nun, at the time of the Exodus (Book of Numbers ;).
 The father of Shemuel, of the Tribe of Simeon
 The father of Pedahel, a prince of the Tribe of Naphtali
 The father of Talmai, king of Geshur, to whom Absalom fled after the murder of Amnon (2 Samuel )
 The son of Omri, and the father of Uthai (1 Chronicles )

References

Book of Numbers people
Books of Samuel people
Books of Chronicles people